Urbanodendron bahiense is a species of plant in the Lauraceae. It is endemic to Rio de Janeiro, Brazil.  The species epithet derives from the mistaken belief that the plant is from Bahia.

References

External links
 

Flora of Brazil
Lauraceae
Endangered plants
Taxonomy articles created by Polbot
Plants described in 1864